The 2015–16 season was Società Sportiva Calcio Napoli's 70th season in Serie A. The team competed in Serie A, the Coppa Italia, and the UEFA Europa League. In Serie A Napoli enjoyed an immense season, finishing in 2nd place and having been in 1st place for much of the mid-season period. Star striker Gonzalo Higuaín became the player with the most goals in a single season in all of Serie A history, with 36 goals, overtaking Gunnar Nordahl's long-standing record of 35. Napoli were eliminated in the quarter-finals of the Coppa Italia by Inter. In the UEFA Europa League, Napoli finished with a perfect 6–0–0 record in the group stage, scoring 22 goals in the process. However, this form did not continue into the knockout phase, where they were eliminated in the round of 32, 2–1 on aggregate by Spanish side and eventual semi-finalists Villarreal.

On 25 May 2015 coach Rafael Benítez was signed by Real Madrid to replace Carlo Ancelotti. Former Empoli manager Maurizio Sarri replaced Benítez on 12 June.

Players

Squad information

Transfers

In

Loans in

Total expenditure: €32.2  million

Out

Loans out

Total revenue: €10.6 million

Net income:  €21.6 million

Competitions

Overall

Last updated: 15 May 2016

Serie A

League table

Results summary

Results by round

Matches

Coppa Italia

UEFA Europa League

Group stage

Knockout phase

Round of 32

Statistics

Appearances and goals

|-
! colspan=14 style="background:#5DAFE3; color:#FFFFFF; text-align:center"| Goalkeepers

|-
! colspan=14 style="background:#5DAFE3; color:#FFFFFF; text-align:center"| Defenders

|-
! colspan=14 style="background:#5DAFE3; color:#FFFFFF; text-align:center"| Midfielders

|-
! colspan=14 style="background:#5DAFE3; color:#FFFFFF; text-align:center"| Forwards

|-
! colspan=14 style="background:#5DAFE3; color:#FFFFFF; text-align:center"| Players transferred out during the season

Goalscorers

Last updated: 14 May 2016

Clean sheets

Last updated: 14 May 2016

References

S.S.C. Napoli seasons
Napoli
Napoli